Maurice Robinson may refer to:

 Maurice Robinson (cricketer) (1921–1994), Irish cricketer
 Maurice Richard Robinson Jr. (1937–2021), American business executive
 Maurice A. Robinson (born 1947), American New Testament scholar
 Maurice Robinson, Northern Irish lorry driver charged with conspiracy to commit human trafficking among other crimes in the 2019 Essex lorry deaths